The 41st Infantry Division (41-ya Pekhotnaya Diviziya) was an infantry formation of the Russian Imperial Army.

Organization
It was part of the 16th Army Corps.
1st Brigade
161st Infantry Regiment
162nd Infantry Regiment
2nd Brigade
163rd Infantry Regiment
164th Infantry Regiment
41st Artillery Brigade

References

Infantry divisions of the Russian Empire
Military units and formations disestablished in 1918